Vilho Harle (born 1947 in Nilsiä) is a Professor of International Relations at University of Lapland in Finland. He was a visiting fellow in 1996–1997 at the Centre for International Studies, the London School of Economics and Political Science. Harle specializes in analysis of concepts of social order in different cultures, including their moral principles and political structures. He has authored or edited more than ten books and scientific journal issues, including Ideas of Social Order in the Ancient World (Greenwood Press, 1998). In his books, Prof. Vilho Harle conducts studies of culturally significant philosophical, religious and literary works that propagate these ideas.

Selected works
 Vilho Harle, The Enemy with a Thousand Faces: The Tradition of the Other in Western Political Thought and History, Greenwood Publishing, March 2000,  Hardcover
 Vilho Harle, Ideas Of Social Order In The Ancient World, Greenwood Publishing, 1998,  Hardcover
 Vilho Harle, Challenges and Responses in European Security, TAPRI, 1986,  Hardcover
 Vilho Harle, Essays in Peace Studies, Ashgate Publishing, 1987,  Hardcover
 Vilho Harle (Editor), Nuclear Weapons in a Changing Europe, 1991 Hardcover
 Vilho Harle (Editor), Political Economy of Food, 1978 Hardcover

Notes and references

1947 births
Living people
People from Nilsiä
Finnish scientists
Academic staff of the University of Lapland